Burwardsley is a civil parish in Cheshire West and Chester, England.  It contains five buildings that are recorded in the National Heritage List for England as designated listed buildings, all of which are at Grade II.  This grade is the lowest of the three gradings given to listed buildings and is applied to "buildings of national importance and special interest".  The parish is entirely rural, its listed buildings consisting of a church, a public house, a farmhouse, a farm building, and a cottage.

See also
Listed buildings in Beeston
Listed buildings in Bickerton
Listed buildings in Broxton
Listed buildings in Bulkeley
Listed buildings in Harthill
Listed buildings in Peckforton
Listed buildings in Tattenhall

References
Citations

Sources

Listed buildings in Cheshire West and Chester
Lists of listed buildings in Cheshire